The Legal Services Commission (LSC) was an executive non-departmental public body of the Ministry of Justice which was responsible for the operational administration of legal aid in England and Wales between 2000 and 2013.

Overview
The LSC was responsible for a budget of around £2 billion annually, and helping over 2 million people with their legal problems across England and Wales each year. It was established under the Access to Justice Act 1999 and in 2000 replaced the Legal Aid Board (founded 30 June 1949). Sponsored by the Ministry of Justice, the LSC helped to protect the fundamental rights of the individual and addressed problems that contribute to social exclusion. The Chair of the LSC was Sir Bill Callaghan and its work was overseen by an independent board of commissioners. The Chief Executive of the LSC was Matthew Coats.

Replacement by Legal Aid Agency
The Legal Aid, Sentencing and Punishment of Offenders Act 2012 made provision for the abolition of the LSC. The LSC was replaced by the Legal Aid Agency, an executive agency of the Ministry of Justice, on 1 April 2013. The agency carries out a similar function to the LSC, although executive agency status differs from the LSC's non-departmental public body status. Independence of decision-making within the Legal Aid Agency is through the post of a Director of Legal Aid Casework, who has independence from the Lord Chancellor in applying directions and guidance to any individual funding decision.

Services 
The LSC was responsible for the development and administration of two service programmes:

 The Civil Legal Service (CLS), which provides services under the Civil Legal Advice (CLA) banner
 The Criminal Defence Service (CDS)

The CLA aimed to improve access to quality information and help for civil legal problems, in fields such as family, debt and housing law. CLA provides direct legal advice services to the public via its Community Legal Advice website and helpline, and also provides advice centre offices for low-income individuals and families, who are referred to participating solicitors and advice agencies that are certified through the CLA's Quality Mark scheme.

The CDS provides free legal advice and representation for people facing criminal charges who are unable to pay for legal help. This is supplied through criminal solicitors’ offices and the Public Defender Service.

Legal case: All About Rights Law Practice
In or around 2009 the LSC decided to replace the provision of legal aid through the civil Unified Contract of 2007 by granting contracts to law firms selected through a series of tendering exercises. There were separate exercises in different fields of law, with some 10,000 bids in total across the civil law tender round. The LSC's tendering exercise for the procurement of mental health services in England and Wales took place in 2010. In error, solicitor Mr. Ranjan Nadarajah, in business as "All About Rights Law Practice", submitted a blank document in place of what should have been his completed tender documentation for the provision of publicly funded mental health legal aid work. Mr. Nadarajah argued that his exclusion from the procurement process was "disproportionate and unjustified". In a ruling handed down after the LSC had closed, Mrs Justice Carr found that "AAR was not unlawfully deprived by the LSC of a contract" and that "the LSC's rejection of AAR's bid was not disproportionate, nor did it amount to unequal treatment".

Criticism
In the House of Commons on 20 July 2010 Robert Buckland MP made what the Parliamentary Under-secretary of State for Justice, Jonathan Djanogly, described as "serious accusations of mismanagement".

References

External links
Legal aid on gov.uk website
LSC at Ministry of Justice website
Legal aid website for legal aid practitioners
Law Society of England & Wales
Access to Justice Act 1999

English law
Legal aid
Solicitors
Defunct non-departmental public bodies of the United Kingdom government